Raúl Vicente Benítez (born 26 June 1994) is a Paraguayan long distance runner who holds the national records of 10 km, fulfilling this in 2013 running 10 km in 35:36:01m. He was an athlete of the Asociación de Atletismo del Alto Paraná, and later represented Olímpico Athletic Club, also in Ciudad del Este. Benítez represented Paraguay at the 2014 South American Cross Country Championships.

Competition record

International competitions

National championships

References

Paraguayan male long-distance runners
Sportspeople from Ciudad del Este
1994 births
Living people
21st-century Paraguayan people